Yerlan Alimbayev (born 6 January 1975) is a Kazakh politician who serves as diplomat. Prior to his appointment as the Ambassador India, Alimbayev has served as Ambassador-at-Large of the Ministry of Foreign Affairs of the Republic of Kazakhstan and as the National Coordinator on the matters of the activities of the Shanghai Cooperation Organization from the Republic of Kazakhstan. In various years, he held diplomatic positions in the Embassies of Kazakhstan in India, the Republic of Korea, as well as the Permanent Mission of the Republic of Kazakhstan to the UN Office and other international organizations in Geneva, Switzerland.

Early life and education
Born in Kyzylorda, Alimbayev earned his bachelor's degree in Oriental studies from the Al-Farabi Kazakh National University. Alimbayev also hold a master's degree from The Geneva School of Diplomacy and International Relations. He speaks Kazakh, Russian, English, French, Hindi and Urdu and is the recipient of several State awards and recognition.

References

1975 births
Living people
Ambassadors of Kazakhstan to India
People from Kyzylorda
Al-Farabi Kazakh National University alumni